"Boyfriend #2" is a song by American R&B singer Pleasure P. It was released as the second single off his first studio album The Introduction of Marcus Cooper, and his second solo release after his departure from Pretty Ricky. The song was written and produced by Jim Jonsin (Rebel Rock Entertainment), Bigg D, (Dadetown Entertainment), Rico Love and EHood & E2 (for Division One) and was released on December 2, 2008.

"Boyfriend #2" has become Pleasure P's most successful solo single to date, peaking at #42 on the Billboard Hot 100 and #2 on the R&B/Hip-Hop Songs chart.

Music video
The video was directed by Pleasure P and Kai Crawford, and premiered Tuesday, January 27 on Myspace.com  and can be viewed here. The video was ranked #52 on BET's Notarized: Top 100 Videos of 2009 countdown.

Remixes
"Boyfriend #2" (The Council Remix) (featuring Flo Rida) (Official Remix)
"Boyfriend #2" (Remix) (featuring Ludacris)
"Boyfriend #2" (Remix) (featuring DJ Webstar)
"Boyfriend #2" (Remix) (featuring Ghostface Killah)
"Boyfriend #2" (Remix) (featuring Usher)
"Boyfriend #2" (Remix) (featuring 2 Pistols)

Charts

Weekly charts

Year-end charts

References

2008 singles
Pleasure P songs
Songs written by Rico Love
2008 songs
Atlantic Records singles
Song recordings produced by Rico Love
Songs written by Jim Jonsin
Songs written by Bigg D